In the finale of the 2006 Estoril Open's Men's Doubles, František Čermák and Leoš Friedl were defending champions from the previous year.  Čermák did not participate. 
Lukáš Dlouhý and Pavel Vízner won in the final 6–3, 6–1, against Lucas Arnold and Leoš Friedl.

Seeds

Draw

Draw

External links
Draw

2006 Estoril Open